The mixed 4 × 100 metre freestyle relay competition of the swimming events at the 2019 Pan American Games are scheduled to be held August 7th, 2019 at the Villa Deportiva Nacional Videna cluster.

Records
Prior to this competition, the existing World Record was as follows:

Results

Heats
The first round was held on August 7.

Final
The final round was also held on August 7.

References

Swimming at the 2019 Pan American Games
Panamerican